Sally Van Doren is an American poet and visual artist from St. Louis, Missouri.  She was awarded the 2007 Walt Whitman Award from the Academy of American Poets for her first collection of poems. Her third book of poems, Promise, was released in August 2017.

Background
Sally Van Doren was born and raised in St. Louis, Missouri. Her father,  William M. Van Cleve, is a lawyer and chairman of the St. Louis-based law firm Bryan Cave. She is a graduate of Phillips Academy and Princeton University and received an M.F.A. from the University of Missouri-St. Louis. She met her husband, John Van Doren, son of quiz show celebrity Charles Van Doren and grandson of Columbia University professor Mark Van Doren at Phillips Academy. The two married in 1986.

She has taught at the 92nd Street Y in New York, creative writing for the St. Louis Public Schools, Washington University in St. Louis and the St. Louis County Juvenile Detention Center. She curates the Sunday Workshop Series for the St. Louis Poetry Center. She is an associate editor at Boulevard and an advisory editor at December. She lives in St. Louis and Cornwall, Connecticut.

Van Doren's work has appeared in: American Poet, Barrow Street, Boulevard, Cincinnati Review, Colorado Review, December, Hubbub, LIT, LiveMag, Margie, The Moth, The New Republic, Parthenon West Review, Poetry Daily, Pool, River Styx, The Southern Review, Southwest Review, 2River and Verse Daily. Her poem, "The Sense Series," was the text for a multimedia performance at the Contemporary Art Museum St. Louis.

Van Doren also read at the Princeton Poetry festival.

Awards
Van Doren was nominated for the 2019 Pushcart Prize for her poem, “Funk,” which appeared in Volume 29.2 of december magazine.

Van Doren was awarded the 2007 Walt Whitman Award from the Academy of American Poets for her first collection of poems, "Sex at Noon Taxes," which was published in the spring of 2008 by LSU Press.

She was a semi-finalist in the 2006 "Discovery"/The Nation Poetry Contest.

Van Doren received the Kenneth O. Hanson Award in 2013 from Hubbub magazine for her poem, “Color Theory.”    She is the recipient of the Loy Ledbetter Award from the St. Louis Poetry Center. She also was a finalist in the Poets Out Loud Prize in 2012-2013.

Works
 
 
 
 "Metronome", Verse Daily
 
 
 "Color Theory". The Art Critic review. Happening in the Hills. December, 2017.
 Visual Poetry at the Cornwall Library: Sally Van Doren's Polysemic Drawings" Lakeville Journal Review. November, 2017.
 "Housewife as Poet" American Life in Poetry. November, 2018.

Van Doren's poetry has also been published in several magazines and journals, including American Letters and Commentary, Cimarron Review, 5AM, Hubbub, Lumina, Mudlark, The New Republic, The Normal School, poets.org, Rhino, South Carolina Review, Tinge, Valparaiso Poetry Review, and Western Humanities Review.

Poetry books

References

External links
 "Preposition" animation, Poetry Everywhere, PBS
 Sallyvandoren.com 
 Poets.Org

Year of birth missing (living people)
Living people
Phillips Academy alumni
Princeton University alumni
Writers from St. Louis
Sally Van Doren
University of Missouri–St. Louis alumni
American women poets